The 2013 Stephen F. Austin Lumberjacks football team represented Stephen F. Austin State University in the 2013 NCAA Division I FCS football season. The Lumberjacks were led by seventh-year head coach J. C. Harper and played their home games at Homer Bryce Stadium. They were a member of the Southland Conference. They finished the season 3–9, 1–6 in Southland play to finish in a tie for seventh place.

Stephen F. Austin Radio Network
All Lumberjacks games aired on KTBQ 107.7 FM and listened to online.

Before the season

Coaching changes
On February 4, J. C. Harper announced his coaching staff would be altered for the 2013 season. Chris Traux was promoted to offensive coordinator after serving on the offensive side of the ball for seven seasons. Lance Guidry was brought in from Western Kentucky to become the new secondary coach. Arlington Nunn changed coaching positions to become the new running backs coach, Jeremy Moses became the quarterbacks coach, and Devin Ducote became the defensive backs coach.

2013 recruits
23 athletes signed on to join Stephen F. Austin for the 2013 football season.

Roster

Schedule

Game summaries

Weber State

Sources:

Texas Tech

Sources:

McMurry

Sources:

Montana State

Sources:

Prairie View A&M

Sources:

Southeastern Louisiana

Sources:

Nicholls State

Sources:

Central Arkansas

Sources:

Sam Houston State

Sources:

McNeese State

Sources:

Lamar

Sources:

Northwestern State

Sources:

Ranking movements

References

Stephen F. Austin
Stephen F. Austin Lumberjacks football seasons
Stephen F. Austin Lumberjacks football